Montani is an Italian surname. Notable people with the surname include:

 Dario Montani (born 1961), Italian former professional racing cyclist
 Matteo Montani (born 1972), Italian painter and sculptor
 Nicola Montani (1880–1948), American conductor, composer, arranger, and publisher of sacred music

Other
 Palazzo Montani Antaldi, Pesaro, Neoclassical-style palace in the city of Pesaro, region of the Marche, Italy

Italian-language surnames